Taekwondo competitions at the 2004 Summer Olympics in Athens were held from August 25 to August 28. There were four weight categories for both men and women. Each NOC could enter 2 men and 2 women, but only 1 athlete per weight category. There was one global Olympic Qualification Tournament and one qualification tournament for each continent. In addition, 4 invitational places were awarded.

Timeline

Qualification summary

Men's events

−58 kg

−68 kg

−80 kg

+80 kg

Women's events

−49 kg

−57 kg

−67 kg

+67 kg

References

External links
 World Taekwondo Federation

Qualification for the 2004 Summer Olympics
2004
Olympic Qualification
Olympic Qualification
Qualification